William Tunstall was a footballer who played 22 league and cup games for Burslem Port Vale in the 1900s.

Career
Tunstall played for Hanley Swifts, before joining Burslem Port Vale in May 1901. He had a successful debut, scoring in a 1–1 draw with Burnley at the Athletic Ground. He went on to play six Second Division and three FA Cup games in the 1901–02 and then six league and two FA Cup games in the 1902–03 season. He was released after just four league and FA Cup appearances in the 1903–04 campaign.

Career statistics
Source:

References

Year of birth missing
Year of death missing
English footballers
Association football forwards
Port Vale F.C. players